Katuaq is a cultural centre in Nuuk, Greenland. It is used for concerts, exhibitions, conferences, and as a cinema. Designed by Schmidt Hammer Lassen, it was constructed as a joint project of the Greenland Home Rule Government, the Nuuk Municipal Council and the Nordic Council of Ministers and was inaugurated on 15 February 1997.

Building
Katuaq is an L-shaped building with an undulating, backward-leaning screen facing onto Nuuk's central urban space. It is raised above the ground and clad in golden larch wood on both the inside and outside. The screen is inspired by the northern lights.  This second skin also creates a contrast to the building proper. Between the perimeter screen and the core building lies the large foyer with three white freestanding elements in the shape of a triangle, square and circle.

Facilities
Katuaq contains two auditoria, the larger one seating 1,008 people and the smaller one 508. The big auditorium is used for concerts, theatre, conferences, and as a cinema. Katuaq also provides meeting facilities, administrative offices and a café.

Offices:
 NAPA - The Nordic Institute in Greenland 
 Hello Norden, the Nordic Council of Ministers information service

Nuuk Center, the country's first shopping mall, is located right next door.

See also 
 List of Greenlandic artists
 Taseralik Culture Center

References

External links
 Katuaq 

Buildings and structures in Nuuk
Greenlandic culture
Schmidt Hammer Lassen buildings